The 2012–13 Wofford Terriers men's basketball team represented Wofford College during the 2012–13 NCAA Division I men's basketball season. The Terriers, led by 11th year head coach Mike Young, played their home games at the Benjamin Johnson Arena and were members of the South Division of the Southern Conference. They finished the season 13–19, 7–11 in SoCon play to finish in a tie for third place in the South Division. they lost in the first round of the SoCon tournament to Georgia Southern.

Roster

Schedule

|-
!colspan=9| Regular season

|-
!colspan=9| 2013 Southern Conference men's basketball tournament

References

Wofford Terriers men's basketball seasons
Wofford
Wolf
Wolf